Hum Sitaray is a Pakistani entertainment channel launched by Hum Network Limited on 14 December 2013. It is a major entertainment channel in Pakistan.

History 
The channel launched on December 14, 2013 with original programming - this had become a trend for Pakistani entertainment to have 2 channels under 1 company (ex. Geo Kahani, ARY Zindagi) but due to bad ratings, the channel turned to air reruns from 2015 onwards with little original programming and since 2016 it has been airing only reruns from Hum TV. Hum Sitaray dubbed the entire Season 1 of the Turkish Historical Drama Dilliris Ertuğrul.

Current programs

Former programs
 Sitaray Ki Subha
 Tonight With HSY

References

External links

 
Hum Network Limited
Television channels and stations established in 2013
Television stations in Pakistan
Television stations in Karachi